Gyro's 3D Fear Factory (known as Gyro's 3D Scream Fest in San Jose) is an annual temporary haunted house attraction hosted in San Jose and Sacramento, California during the weeks leading up to Halloween.

Locations
Both attractions are set up in large shopping venues; in 2007, the San Jose event was hosted inside the Westfield Oakridge Mall, and the Sacramento event was hosted in the Westfield Downtown Plaza.

External links
 Official website

Horror fiction